Ypsolopha horridella is a moth of the family Ypsolophidae. It is found in northern and central Europe, the Middle East, China and Russia.

The wingspan is 16–21 mm. Adults are on wing from July to August.

The larvae feed on the leaves of Malus species and Prunus spinosa in a slight web.

Etymology
The name is derived from the Latin horridus (meaning shaggy) and refers to the raised scale-tufts or crests on the dorsal part of the wings.

References

Ypsolophidae
Moths of Europe
Moths of Asia